Bhagirathi Films is an Indian film production company established by senior journalist and filmmaker Vinod Kapri. Founded in 2015, Bhagirathi Films won the National Film Award for Best Film on Social Issues at the 62nd National Film Awards.

Awards

 62nd National Film Awards: Best Non Feature Film on Social Issues: Can't Take This Shit Anymore

Filmography

References

External links
 Official website

Hindi cinema
Film production companies based in Mumbai
2015 establishments in Maharashtra